Łabowa  (Lemko: Labova) is a village in Nowy Sącz County, Lesser Poland Voivodeship, in southern Poland. It is the seat of the gmina (administrative district) called Gmina Łabowa.

The village has a population of 6,005.

External links
 Jewish Community in Łabowa on Virtual Shtetl

References

Villages in Nowy Sącz County